Gravette School District is a public school district based in Gravette, Arkansas, United States. The Gravette School District provides early childhood, elementary and secondary education for more than 1,800 pre-kindergarten through grade 12 students at its four facilities.

Gravette School District and all of its schools are accredited by the Arkansas Department of Education (ADE) and AdvancED.

The district includes the majority of Gravette, as well as all of Maysville and Sulphur Springs, and a section of Bella Vista.

Schools 
 Gravette High School—grades 9 through 12.
 Gravette Middle School—grades 6 through 8.
 Gravette Upper Elementary School—grades 3 through 5.
 Glenn Duffy Elementary School—pre-kindergarten through grade 2.

References

External links 
 

School districts in Arkansas
Education in Benton County, Arkansas